Subkhangulovo (Sobxanğol) is a rural locality (a village) in Urshaksky Selsoviet, Aurgazinsky District, Bashkortostan, Russia. The population was 93 as of 2010. There are 2 streets.

Geography 
Subkhangulovo is located 39 km northwest of Tolbazy (the district's administrative centre) by road. Nadezhdino is the nearest rural locality.

References 

Rural localities in Aurgazinsky District